The 1994–95 NBA season was the Timberwolves' 6th season in the National Basketball Association. The Timberwolves received the fourth overall pick in the 1994 NBA draft, and selected Donyell Marshall from the University of Connecticut. During the off-season, the team acquired Sean Rooks from the Dallas Mavericks, and signed free agents Winston Garland, and undrafted rookie guard Darrick Martin in February. Under new head coach Bill Blair, the Timberwolves continued to struggle losing 13 of their first 14 games, including a 7-game losing streak, as Micheal Williams missed all but one game of the season due to a left heel injury. In December, the team signed free agent Greg Foster, who was previously released by the Chicago Bulls. At midseason, Marshall was traded to the Golden State Warriors in exchange for Tom Gugliotta. The Timberwolves held an 11–36 record at the All-Star break, lost nine of their final ten games, and finished last place in the Midwest Division with a 21–61 record, setting a dubious record in becoming the first team ever to lose 60 or more games in four consecutive seasons.

Second-year star Isaiah Rider led the team in scoring with 20.4 points per game, while Christian Laettner averaged 16.3 points and 7.6 rebounds per game, and Doug West contributed 12.9 points per game. In addition, Rooks provided the team with 10.9 points and 6.1 rebounds per game, and Garland contributed 6.1 points and 4.4 assists per game as the team's starting point guard in Williams' absence.

Following the season, Martin signed as a free agent with the newly expansion Vancouver Grizzlies, while Foster signed with the Utah Jazz, and Garland, Stacey King, Chris Smith and Mike Brown were all released to free agency.

Draft picks

Roster

Regular season

Season standings

z - clinched division title
y - clinched division title
x - clinched playoff spot

Record vs. opponents

Game log

Regular season

|- align="center" bgcolor="#ffcccc"
| 2
| November 5, 19947:00p.m. CST
| Houston
| L 85–115
| Rider (18)
| Marshall (7)
| Smith (4)
| Target Center16,578
| 0–2

|- align="center" bgcolor="#ccffcc"
| 35
| January 16, 19957:00p.m. CST
| Houston
| W 94–75
| Rider (24)
| West (11)
| Garland, West (6)
| Target Center12,442
| 8–27
|- align="center" bgcolor="#ffcccc"
| 41
| January 28, 19957:30p.m. CST
| @ Houston
| L 93–114
| Eisley, Laettner (14)
| Laettner (8)
| Eisley, Rider (4)
| The Summit16,611
| 10–31

|- align="center"
|colspan="9" bgcolor="#bbcaff"|All-Star Break
|- style="background:#cfc;"
|- bgcolor="#bbffbb"

|- align="center" bgcolor="#ccffcc"
| 57
| March 3, 19957:00p.m. CST
| Houston
| W 108–105
| Gugliotta (21)
| Laettner (8)
| Gugliotta, Laettner (6)
| Target Center17,068
| 16–41
|- align="center" bgcolor="#ffcccc"
| 64
| March 16, 19957:30p.m. CST
| @ Houston
| L 97–104
| Rooks (21)
| Laettner (8)
| Gugliotta, West (5)
| The Summit10,711
| 17–47

Player statistics

Awards and records

Transactions

See also
 1994-95 NBA season

References

Minnesota Timberwolves seasons
Timber
Timber
Monnesota